ICT may refer to:

Sciences and technology

 Information and communications technology 
 Image Constraint Token, in video processing
 Immunochromatographic test, a rapid immunoassay used to detect diseases such as anthrax
 In-circuit test, in electronics
 Inflammation of connective tissue, in medicine
 Insulin coma therapy, a form of psychiatric treatment

Places
 Islamabad Capital Territory, Pakistan
 Wichita Dwight D. Eisenhower National Airport, Kansas, US (IATA airport code ICT)

Agencies, businesses and organizations

Government agencies
 Costa Rican Tourism Board
 Information and Communication Technology Authority, a Kenyan Government-owned corporation

Other organizations
 Institute for Creative Technologies, University of Southern California
 Institute of Chemical Technology, Mumbai, India
 International Campaign for Tibet, headquartered in Washington, DC
 International Computers and Tabulators, a British computing company, now part of Fujitsu Services
 International Institute for Counter-Terrorism, Herzliya, Isis
 Inverness Caledonian Thistle F.C., a Scottish football club
 International City Theater, a theatre in Long Beach, California
 International Crimes Tribunal (disambiguation)

Other uses
 ICT News, formerly Indian Country Today, a digital news platform in the United States
 Indochina Time, a time zone of UTC+07:00
 Intercollegiate Championship Tournament, a US quiz competition
 Innovative Clean Transit rule

See also
 Ice-T, rapper and actor
 ICTS (disambiguation)